François Gourmet (born 28 December 1982, in Libramont) is a retired Belgian decathlete. His personal best score is 7974 points, achieved at the 2007 World Championships in Osaka, Japan. He is a former Belgian record holder.

Achievements

References

1982 births
Living people
Belgian decathletes
Universiade medalists in athletics (track and field)
People from Libramont-Chevigny
Sportspeople from Luxembourg (Belgium)
Universiade silver medalists for Belgium
Medalists at the 2005 Summer Universiade